Charles Joe Henderson (born April 1870, date of death unknown) was an English professional footballer who played as an inside forward.

References

1870 births
Year of death missing
Sportspeople from Durham, England
Footballers from County Durham
English footballers
Association football inside forwards
Darlington F.C. players
South Bank F.C. players
Grimsby Town F.C. players
Leith Athletic F.C. players
Bolton Wanderers F.C. players
Wolverhampton Wanderers F.C. players
Sheffield United F.C. players
New Brighton Tower F.C. players
Dundee Harp F.C. players
Edinburgh Thistle F.C. players
English Football League players
FA Cup Final players